Commander Harold Auten  (22 August 1891 – 3 October 1964) was a Royal Naval Reserve (RNR) officer who was awarded the Victoria Cross, the highest award for gallantry in the face of the enemy that can be awarded to British and Commonwealth forces. He received his medal for an action during the English Channel campaign of the First World War.

A former pupil of Wilson's School, Wallington, London, Auten had joined the RNR before the outbreak of the First World War during which he served in Q-ships. He was promoted to Lieutenant in 1917 and was awarded the Distinguished Service Cross "for services in Vessels of the Royal Navy employed on Patrol and Escort duty" in that year.

Citation 
He was awarded the Victoria Cross in 1918 following an action when he was commanding a Q-ship, HMS Stock Force:

(Note: the "panic party" was a group of the crew who would pretend to "abandon ship" when a Q-ship was attacked.)

Auten's Victoria Cross is on display at the Royal Naval Museum, in Portsmouth, England.

Later work
Harold Auten wrote Q Boat Adventures, the first book on Q-ships in 1919.

After the war he became an executive vice-president of the Rank Organisation in New York and lived for thirty years in Bushkill, Pennsylvania, where he owned a hotel and cinema. However, he remained a member of the RNR and in 1941 he was awarded the Royal Naval Reserve Officers Decoration.

During World War II, he held the rank of Commander (later acting Captain) in the RNR and served as senior staff organizing trans-Atlantic convoys. He was made an Officer of the United States Legion of Merit "for distinguished service to the Allied cause throughout the war" and a Commander of the Order of Orange-Nassau "for service to the Royal Netherlands Navy during the War". He was a Younger Brother of Trinity House.

References

Notes

Bibliography
Monuments to Courage (David Harvey, 1999)
The Register of the Victoria Cross (This England, 1997)
VCs of the First World War - The Naval VCs (Stephen Snelling, 2002)
"Q" Boat Adventures (Lieut-Commander Harold Auten, V.C. MCMX1X )
Allport, D.H. & Friskney, N.J. "A Short History of Wilson's School", Wilson's School Charitable Trust, 1987
AUTEN, Captain Harold, Who Was Who, A & C Black, 1920–2008; online edn, Oxford University Press, Dec 2007
Biography: Harold Auten VC  – Royal Naval Museum Library

External links
Burial location of Harold Auten "Pennsylvania, USA"
Location of Harold Auten's Victoria Cross "Royal Naval Museum, Portsmouth"

1891 births
1964 deaths
Military personnel from Surrey
People from Leatherhead
People educated at Wilson's School, Wallington
English emigrants to the United States
Royal Navy officers of World War I
Royal Navy officers of World War II
British World War I recipients of the Victoria Cross
Royal Navy recipients of the Victoria Cross
Officers of the Legion of Merit
Commanders of the Order of Orange-Nassau
Recipients of the Distinguished Service Cross (United Kingdom)
Royal Naval Reserve personnel
Members of Trinity House